29 Arietis is a triple star system in the northern constellation of Aries. 29 Arietis is the Flamsteed designation. The system is barely visible to the naked eye with an apparent visual magnitude of 6.0; it is 0.02 degree north of the ecliptic. It is moving further from Earth with a heliocentric radial velocity of 9 km/s.

The larger member of this pair has 114% of the mass of the Sun, while its companion has 88% of the Sun's mass. Orbiting the pair at an angular separation of 1.422 arcseconds over a period of 164 years, the tertiary component has 52% of the Sun's mass.

References

External links
 HR 741
 Image 29 Arietis
 GJ 3161

F-type main-sequence stars
Solar-type stars
Spectroscopic binaries
Triple star systems
Aries (constellation)
Durchmusterung objects
Arietis, 29
3161
015814
011843
0741